Philippine English (similar and related to American English) is any variety of English native to the Philippines, including those used by the media and the vast majority of educated Filipinos and English learners in the Philippines from adjacent Asian countries. English is taught in schools as one of the two official languages of the country, the other being Filipino (Tagalog). Due to the influx of Filipino English teachers overseas, Philippine English is also becoming the prevalent variety of English being learned in the Far East as taught by Filipino teachers in various Asian countries such as Korea, Japan and Thailand, among others. Due to the highly multilingual nature of the Philippines, code-switching such as Taglish (Tagalog-infused English) and Bislish (English infused with any of the Bisayan languages) is prevalent across domains from casual settings to formal situations.

History
Filipinos were first introduced to English when the British invaded and occupied Manila and Cavite in 1762 as part of the Seven Years' War, but this occupation had no lasting effect on English in the country. A national variety called Philippine English evolved as a result of the American colonization, and was arguably one of the fastest to develop in the postcolonial world. Its origins as an English language spoken by a large segment of the Philippine population can be traced to the American introduction of public education, taught in the English medium of instruction. This was marked by the arrival of the Thomasites in 1901, immediately during re-colonization after the Philippine Revolution in the late 19th century up to the early 1900. After a tumultuous period of colonial transition, Filipino leaders and elites, and the American colonial government alike begun discussing the formation of a Philippine national language. The retained high ethnolinguistic diversity of the new colony was due to low penetration of Spanish under Spain's rule. Spanish was limited to a medium of instruction for the landed elites and gentry. At the end of Spanish colonization, only 3-5% of the colonial population could speak Spanish. The lingering effects of Spanish amongst the general population nevertheless had notable effects on the lexical development of many Philippine languages, and even Philippine English, in the form of hispanisms. Tagalog was selected to be the basis for a national language in 1937, and has since remained so. It was re-labelled as Pilipino in 1959,  and Filipino in 1987. With the successful establishment of American-style public education having English as a consequential medium, more than 20% of the Philippine population were reported to be able to understand and speak English just before the turn of mid-20th century. This meteoric growth was sustained post-World War II, much further through Philippine mass media (e.g. newsprint, radio, television) where English also became the dominant language, and by the ratification into the current Philippine Constitution in 1987, both Filipino and English were declared co-official languages. In 2020, the Philippines was ranked 27th worldwide (among 100 countries ranked) in the EF English Proficiency Index. In the same report, it was ranked 2nd in Asia next only to Singapore.

Today Philippine English, as formally called based on the World Englishes framework of linguist Braj Kachru, is a recognized variety of English with its distinct lexical, phonological, and grammatical features (with considerable variations across socioeconomic groups and level of education being predictors of English proficiency in the Philippines). As English language became highly embedded in Philippine society, it was only a matter of time before the language was indigenized to the point that it became differentiated from English varieties found in the United States, United Kingdom, or elsewhere. This, along with the formal introduction of the World Englishes (WE) framework to English language scholars in the Philippines opened the floodgates to research on this new emerging English, which has since been branded as such as Philippine English.

Philippine English in the services sector

The abundant supply of English speakers and competitive labor costs enabled the Philippines to become a choice destination for foreign companies wishing to establish call centers and other outsourcing. English proficiency sustains a major call center industry and in 2005, America Online had 1,000 people in what used to be the US Air Force's Clark Air Base in Angeles City answering ninety percent of their global e-mail inquiries. Citibank does its global ATM programming in the country, and Procter & Gamble has over 400 employees in Makati, a central Manila neighborhood, doing back office work for their Asian operations including finance, accounting, human resources and payments processing.

An influx of foreign students, principally from South Korea, has also led to growth in the number of English language learning centers, especially in Metro Manila, Baguio, Metro Cebu and Metro Bacolod.

Positioning
In 2003, Edgar W. Schneider defined a Dynamic Model of the evolution of Postcolonial Englishes, positioning Philippine English in Phase 3, Nativization. In 2016, Ariane Macalinga Borlongan argued in a research article that that Philippine English had met the parameters set for repositioning into Phase 4, Endonormative stabilization.

Orthography and grammar

Orthography
Philippine laws and court decisions, with extremely rare exceptions, are written solely in English. English is also used in higher education, religious affairs, print and broadcast media, and business. Most educated Filipinos are bilinguals and speak English as one of their languages. For highly technical subjects such as nursing, medicine, computing and calculus, English is the preferred medium for textbooks, communication, etc. Very few would prefer highly technical books in either Filipino or the regional language. Movies and TV shows in English are usually not dubbed in most cable channels except a few such as Tagalized Movie Channel.

Because English is part of the curricula from primary to secondary education, many Filipinos write and speak in fluent Philippine English, although there might be differences in pronunciation. Most schools in the Philippines, however, are staffed by teachers who are speakers of Philippine English and hence notable differences from the American English from which it was derived are observable.

Grammar
Philippine English traditionally follows American English spelling and grammar while it shares some similarity to Commonwealth English. Philippine English follows the latter when it comes to punctuation as well as date notations. For example, a comma almost never precedes the final item in an enumeration (much like the AP Stylebook and other style guides in English-language journalism generally). Except for some very fluent speakers (like news anchors), even in English-language media, dates are also often read with a cardinal instead of an ordinal number.
Most Filipinos say "January one" (instead of "January first" or "January the first") even if the written form is the same. This is mostly because educated Filipinos were taught to count English numbers cardinally, thus it carried over to their style of reading dates. In reading the day-month-year date notation used by some areas in the government (e.g. 1 January), it may be pronounced as "one January" instead of "the first of January" or rearranged to the month-first reading "January one". Foreign nationals of Filipino descent, however, may have continued to read dates in English based on the conventions of their birth countries.
Perhaps because of this practice, levels of primary pupils and secondary students are usually referred to as grade one, grade two, and so on, similar to Canadian English, rather than American first grade, second grade, etc.
Tautologies like redundancy and pleonasm are common despite the emphasis on avoiding them, stressing brevity and simplicity in making sentences; they are common to many speakers, especially among the older generations. The possible explanation is that the English language teachers who came to the Philippines were taught old-fashioned grammar, thus they spread that style to the students they served.
Examples are "At this point in time" and ".. will be the one ..." (or "... will be the one who will ...") instead of "now" and "... will ..." respectively - e.g., "I will be the one who will go ...", rather than "I will go ...".
Collective nouns are generally singular in construction, e.g., my family is doing well as opposed to my family are doing well or the group was walking as opposed to the group were walking. This is also the case in American English.
The past tense and past participles of the verbs learn, spell and smell are often regular (learned, spelled, smelled) in Philippine English. These are also the case in American English.
River follows the name of the river in question, e.g., Pasig River, rather than the British convention of coming before the name, e.g., River Thames. This is also the case in North American English.
While prepositions before days may be omitted in American English, e.g., She resigned Thursday, they are retained in Philippine English: She resigned on Thursday. This is shared with British English. However, those prepositions are usually omitted in journalistic practice.
The institutional nouns hospital and university sometimes do not take the definite article, e.g. He's in hospital and She's at university, while sometimes they do, e.g. He's in the hospital and She's at the university.
On the weekend is used in favor of the British at the weekend which is not encountered in Philippine English.
Ranges of dates use to, e.g., Monday to Friday, rather than Monday through Friday. This is shared with British English and is in contrast to American English.
When speaking or writing out numbers, and is not inserted before the tens, i.e., five hundred sixty-nine rather than five hundred and sixty-nine. This is in contrast to British English. Additionally, the insertion of and is also common in American English.
The preposition to in write to (e.g. I'll write to you [something]) is always retained, as opposed to American usage where it may be dropped. 
Philippine English does not share the British usage of read (v) to mean study (v). Therefore, it may be said that He studies law but not that He reads law.
When referring to time, Filipinos refer to 12:30 as half past twelve or, alternatively, twelve thirty and do not use the British half twelve. Similarly, (a) quarter to twelve is used for 11:45 rather than (a) quarter of twelve, which is found in American English.
To take a shower or take a bath are the most common usages in Philippine English, in contrast to British English which uses have a shower and have a bath. However, bathe is as often as similar to American or British usage, but not widespread.
Did: The past tense is ill-formed when used together instead of the present tense with the word "did", e.g. Only then did I 'knew'...  instead of 'Only then did I 'know'. This syntax is incorrect in Standard English.
Directional suffix -ward(s) is used in the Philippines, ultimately favoring the British usage. Philippine English uses the British  towards, afterwards and upwards over the American toward, afterward and upward. However, forward is more prevalent than the chiefly British forwards. Philippine English users drop the -s when using phrasal verbs such as look forward to.
When reading decimal numerals that are usually two or three digits, each numeral is read like a whole number rather than by each digit, e.g. (0).99 is (zero) point ninety-nine, instead of (zero) point nine nine or, especially in schools, ninety-nine hundredths in both British and American English. Additionally, four-digit decimals are also treated similar to how Americans read four-digit numbers with non-zero tens and ones as pairs of two-digit numbers without saying "hundred" and inserting "oh"; 3.1416 is thus "three point fourteen sixteen" and not "three point one four one six" as pronounced.

University
The word course in the Philippines shares the British definition of the entire program of study, which may extend over several years and be made up of any number of modules, hence it is also practically synonymous to a degree program.
When a student takes an exam, a Philippine English user shall say 'takes an exam' in favor of the British 'sit an exam'.
When a student prepares for an exam, a Philippine English user shall say 'review' in favor of the British 'revise'.
When a student takes a course in university, a Philippine English user shall say 'I study law' in favor of the British 'I read law'.
In the Philippines, a student studies or majors in a subject (although a student's major, concentration or, less commonly, emphasis is also used in Philippine colleges or universities to refer to the major subject of study). To major in something refers to the student's principal course of study; to study may refer to any class being taken.

Monetary units
Philippine English speakers would often say two hundred fifty over the British and alternatively American two hundred and fifty. In British and sometimes American English, the "and" comes after the hundreds (one thousand, two hundred and thirty dollars). Philippine English does not observe this.
Philippine English speakers would often say one hundred fifty over the American a hundred (and) fifty.
In Philippine English, particularly in television or radio advertisements, integers can be pronounced individually in the expression of amounts. For example, on sale for ₱399 might be expressed on sale for three nine nine, though the full three hundred and ninety-nine pesos is also common. Philippine English follows the American English on sale for three ninety-nine, which is understood as ₱399; In the past this may have been understood as ₱3.99, however due to inflation, ₱3.99 is no longer a common price for goods.

Vocabulary

As a historical colony of the United States, the Philippine English lexicon shares most of its vocabulary from American English, but also has loanwords from native languages and Spanish, as well as some usages, coinages, and slang peculiar to the Philippines. Due to the influence of the Spanish languages, Philippine English also contains Spanish-derived terms, including Anglicizations, some resulting in false friends, such as "salvage". Philippine English also borrowed words from Philippine languages, especially native plant and animal names (e.g. "ampalaya", balimbing"), and cultural concepts with no exact English equivalents (e.g. kilig); some borrowings from Philippine languages have entered mainstream English, such as abaca and ylang-ylang.

For rail transport terminology, Philippine English uses both British and American parlance. Both the British railway and the American railroad spellings are acceptable in formal discussion and official documents, the former being used in the context of the Philippine National Railways while the latter having more genericized usage. British terms used in the country include bogie (US truck), coach (US railcar), and train driver (US [railroad] engineer). American terms used in the country include boxcar (UK goods wagon), caboose (UK brake van), and consist (UK rake).

Spelling and style
Philippine spelling is significantly closer to American than British spelling, as it adopted the systematic reforms promulgated in Noah Webster's 1828 Dictionary. However, there are exceptions below.

 French-derived words which in British English end with our, such as colour, honour and labour, are usually spelled with or in Philippine English: color, honor and labor, though the British rule of spelling words ending in -our is sometimes used.
 Words which in British English end with ise, such as realise, recognise and organise are spelled with ize in Philippine English: realize, recognize and organize. A notable exception is exercise (as in American English).
 Words which in British English end with yse, such as analyse, paralyse and catalyse are spelled with yze in Philippine English: analyze, paralyze and catalyze, though the British English style of spelling those words are sometimes used.
 French-derived words which in British English end with re, such as  fibre, centre and metre are spelled with er in Philippine English: fiber, center and meter. The spellings ogre and euchre are also used in Philippine English. More recent French loanwords keep the -re spelling in Philippine English. These are not exceptions when a French-style pronunciation is used ( rather than ), as with double entendre, genre and oeuvre. However, the unstressed  pronunciation of an -er ending is used more (or less) often with some words, including cadre, macabre, maître d', Notre Dame, piastre, and timbre. The word theater, using American spelling, is as common as theatre, which always follows the British English spelling.
 There is no preference for words spelled with log in American English or logue in British English in Philippine English: Some words are usually spelled with log, like catalog and analog, while others are typically spelled with logue, like monologue or dialogue. 
 Ae and oe are not maintained in words such as oestrogen and mediaeval as Philippine English favors the American English practice of using e alone (as in estrogen and medieval). Though -ae and -oe are rarely used in Philippine English, words that retain the -ae or -oe include: aesthetic, amoeba and archaeology.
 A double-consonant l is usually retained in Philippine English when adding suffixes to words ending in l where the consonant is unstressed, contrary to American English. Therefore, cancelled and travelling are more prominent than the American spelling of canceled and traveling.
  Where British English uses a single-consonant l in the words skilful, wilful, enrol, distil, enthral, fulfil and instalment, Philippine English typically uses a double consonant: skillful, willful, enroll, distill, enthrall, fulfill and installment.
 The British English defence and offence are spelled defense and offense in Philippine English.
 Philippine English uses practice and license for both nouns and verbs rather than licence for the second noun and practise for the first verb.
 Philippine English uses acknowledgement and judgement etc. as opposed to acknowledgment and judgment.
 Examples of individual words where the preferred spelling is different from current British spellings include program (in all contexts) as opposed to programme, loveable as opposed to lovable and guerrilla as opposed to guerilla. However, programme is often used in the sense of "A leaflet listing information about a play, game or other activity" for distinguishment.

Style
The DD/MM/YYYY and MM/DD/YYYY date format are used in the Philippines for date notation and the 12-hour clock for time notation.

Keyboard layout
There are two major English language keyboard layouts, the United States layout and the United Kingdom layout. Keyboards and keyboard software for the Philippine market universally use the US keyboard layout, which lacks the pound sterling, euro and negation symbols and uses a different layout for punctuation symbols than the UK keyboard layout.

Phonology
Philippine English is a rhotic accent mainly due to the influence of Philippine languages, which are the first language of most of its speakers. Another influence is the rhotic characteristic of American English, which became the longstanding standard in the archipelago since Americans introduced the language in public education. This is contrary to most Commonwealth English variants spoken in neighboring countries such as Malaysia or Singapore. The only exception to this rule is the word Marlboro, which is frequently read as Malboro. Therefore,  phonemes are pronounced in all positions. However, some children of Overseas Filipinos who are educated in Commonwealth countries (such as Australia, New Zealand or the United Kingdom) may speak in a non-rhotic accent unless taught otherwise. Native and well-educated speakers (also called acrolectal speakers) may also feature flapping and vowel sounds resembling the California vowel shift due to the influence of Hollywood movies and call center culture mostly pegged towards the American market.

For non-native speakers, Philippine English phonological features are heavily dependent on the speaker's mother tongue, although foreign languages such as Spanish also influenced many Filipinos on the way of pronouncing English words. This is why approximations are very common, along with hypercorrections and hyperforeignisms. Another feature is a general absence of the schwa ; it is instead pronounced by its respective equivalent full vowel, although the r-colored variant  has been increasingly popular in recent years.

Consonants
The following consonant changes apply for most non-native speakers of the language:
The rhotic consonant  may vary between a trill , a flap  and an approximant .
This can be also observed from speakers of Hiberno-English dialects and a number of American English speakers.
For these reasons, the use of yod-coalescence is another case of approximation for aspirated consonants which Philippine languages lack in general in words such as twelve.
Yod-retention is usually practiced selectively, similar to the historical mid-Atlantic accent in the U.S., Irish or British and Commonwealth English, and to a lesser extent, some speakers of English in Canada, in certain words such as new(s) but not student. For that reason, maneuver is mainly pronounced also with a yod, somewhat in a hyperforeign manner, whereas all other accents drop it intrinsically. However, yod-dropping is often common due to influence of modern General American. The yod as retained in many words is sometimes coalesced; see "Yod-coalescence" above.
The fricative  may be devoiced into  in words such as measure or affricated into  in words such as beige.
Older speakers tend to add an i or e sound before the syllable-initial clusters sl-, sm-, sn-, sp- and st- due to Spanish influence, so the words star and lipstick sounds like (i/e)star and lip(i/e)stick respectively.
Like most non-native speakers of English elsewhere, the "dark l" is merged into the usual "light"  equivalent.
The compound  is pronounced as a palatal lateral approximant  in between vowels (e.g. gorilla), especially to those who were exposed to Spanish orthography. This is negligible among younger well-educated speakers.
The letter "z" is usually pronounced (and sometimes spelled) as a "zey"  like in Jamaican English. However, in standard Philippine English, it is pronounced as the American "zee".

Vowels
The schwa —although a phonological feature across numerous Philippine languages such as Karay-a, Maranao, or the Abagatan (Southern) dialect of Ilocano—is absent as a separate phoneme.

The following are the various approximations of the schwa:
The  in words such as knowledge or college, it is pronounced as a diphthong , making it rhyme with age.
The  phoneme may be merged or replaced by the longer  for some speakers. The words peel and pill might sound the same.
The u sound from the digraph qu may be dropped before e and i in some words such as tranquilize(r) and colloquial.

Emphasis
 Distinct non-native emphasis or stress is common. Additionally, words ending in -ary  such as beneficiary, complementary, elementary, judiciary and supplementary are treated as paroxytones or stressed on the /a/, rather than as proparoxytones or the preceding syllable, a hyperforeignism from the Spanish-derived -aria/-arya and -ario/-aryo.

Pronunciation
Many Filipinos often have distinct non-native English pronunciation, and many fall under different lectal variations (i.e. basilectal, mesolectal, acrolectal). Some Philippine languages (e.g. However, Filipinos' first languages have generally different phonological repertoires (if not more simplified compared to English), and this leads to mis- or distinct pronunciations particularly among basilectal and to some extent mesolectal speakers.

See also

 International English
 English as a second or foreign language
 Formal written English
 List of dialects of the English language
 List of English words of Philippine origin
 Regional accents of English speakers
 Spanglish
 Special English
 Philippine literature in English
 List of loanwords in Tagalog
 Coño English, English-Tagalog code-switching based on English
 Taglish, Tagalog-English codeswitching based on Tagalog
 Hokaglish, Hokkien-Tagalog-English contact language in the Philippines

References

Further reading
 Acar, A. "Models, Norms and Goals for English as an International Language Pedagogy and Task Based Language Teaching and Learning.", The Asian EFL Journal, Volume 8. Issue 3, Article 9, (2006).
 Manarpaac, Danilo. "When I was a child I spoke as a child": Reflecting on the Limits of a Nationalist Language Policy. In: Christian Mair. The politics of English as a world language: new horizons in postcolonial cultural studies. Rodopi; 2003 [cited February 18, 2011]. . p. 479–492.
 Lerner, Ted. Hey, Joe, a slice of the city - an American in Manila. Book of Dreams: Verlag, Germany. 1999.

External links

The Language Planning Situation in the Philippines, by Andrew Gonzalez, FSC, with sections on Philippine English
Philippine English, by Tom McArthur.
English proficiency in Cebu
American or Philippine English? (video)

 

Dialects of English